Wannarot Sonthichai (born 10 April 1989), nickname Vill is a Thai film and television actress from Exact/OneHD. She's known for her roles in Kaew Lom Phet, Sao Noi, Dok Ruk Rim Tang, Sud Sai Pan, and Ngao Jai.

Early life and career 
Wannarot Sonthichai was born on 10 April 1989 in Bangkok, Thailand. 
Vill Wannarot's family consists of her father, mother, Kate Sonthichai, and younger sister.
As a child, Vill Wannarot's parents enrolled her in piano lessons and dancing classes.
Vill Wannarot entered the Thai entertainment industry alongside Yuke Songpaisan when they both auditioned together at Exact. Songpaisarn and Wannarot were later paired up and debuted as leads in the lakorn, Kaew Lorm Petch. It was a success and achieved a rating of 17 for its highest rating for an episode. Yuke Songpaisan and Vill Wannarot quickly became one of the most popular "koojins" (golden couples) during that era.

Filmography

Film

Television

Music videos 
"Kwarm Poog Pun (Seu Kwarm Ruk) Mai Dai" Gaam The Star
"Yoo Peur Ter" Ruj the star
"Hug" Bie Sukrit Wisedkaew
"Yood Tee Ter" Premmanat Suwannanon
"Ter Kher Thang Hua Jai" Gam Koonkornpach
"Ngao Nai Hua Jai" Pex Zeal & Noona Neungthida Sopon
"Tee Ruk" Ann Thitima

Commercials 
  NEUTROGENA 
 ESSENTIAL DAMAGE CARE 
nivea super mousse

Advertising

FilmographyMC 
 Television 
 20 : On Air

 Online 
 20 : On Air YouTube:Vill Wannarot

References

External links 
 
 

Living people
Wannarot Sonthichai
Wannarot Sonthichai
1989 births
Wannarot Sonthichai
Wannarot Sonthichai
Wannarot Sonthichai
Wannarot Sonthichai
Wannarot Sonthichai
Wannarot Sonthichai
Wannarot Sonthichai
Wannarot Sonthichai